The 1964–65 NBA season was the 76ers 16th season in the NBA and 2nd season in City Philadelphia. The team made a major trade to obtain the services of Wilt Chamberlain during the middle of the season. In the playoffs, they took the Boston Celtics to a 7th and decisive game. With the Sixers down 110-109 & only 5 seconds on the clock, Hal Greer inbounded the ball, and John Havlicek made a play for the ages when he stole the inbound pass, and the Celtics went on to win the game, and eventually their 7th consecutive championship.

Roster

Regular season

Season standings

x – clinched playoff spot

Record vs. opponents

Game log

Playoffs

|- align="center" bgcolor="#ccffcc"
| 1
| March 24
| @ Cincinnati
| W 119–117 (OT)
| Hal Greer (37)
| Wilt Chamberlain (23)
| Greer, Kerr (6)
| Cincinnati Gardens6,422
| 1–0
|- align="center" bgcolor="#ffcccc"
| 2
| March 26
| Cincinnati
| L 120–121
| Wilt Chamberlain (30)
| Wilt Chamberlain (15)
| Wilt Chamberlain (10)
| Municipal Auditorium5,801
| 1–1
|- align="center" bgcolor="#ccffcc"
| 3
| March 28
| @ Cincinnati
| W 108–94
| Hal Greer (30)
| Wilt Chamberlain (15)
| Wilt Chamberlain (6)
| Cincinnati Gardens6,289
| 2–1
|- align="center" bgcolor="#ccffcc"
| 4
| March 31
| Cincinnati
| W 119–112
| Wilt Chamberlain (38)
| Wilt Chamberlain (26)
| Hal Greer (7)
| Municipal Auditorium7,451
| 3–1
|-

|- align="center" bgcolor="#ffcccc"
| 1
| April 4
| @ Boston
| L 98–108
| Wilt Chamberlain (33)
| Wilt Chamberlain (31)
| three players tied (3)
| Boston Garden13,909
| 0–1
|- align="center" bgcolor="#ccffcc"
| 2
| April 6
| Boston
| W 109–103
| Wilt Chamberlain (30)
| Wilt Chamberlain (39)
| Wilt Chamberlain (8)
| Municipal Auditorium9,790
| 1–1
|- align="center" bgcolor="#ffcccc"
| 3
| April 8
| @ Boston
| L 94–112
| Wilt Chamberlain (24)
| Wilt Chamberlain (37)
| Hal Greer (4)
| Boston Garden13,909
| 1–2
|- align="center" bgcolor="#ccffcc"
| 4
| April 9
| Boston
| W 134–131 (OT)
| Wilt Chamberlain (34)
| Wilt Chamberlain (34)
| Costello, Kerr (5)
| Municipal Auditorium9,294
| 2–2
|- align="center" bgcolor="#ffcccc"
| 5
| April 11
| @ Boston
| L 108–114
| Wilt Chamberlain (30)
| Wilt Chamberlain (21)
| Hal Greer (4)
| Boston Garden13,909
| 2–3
|- align="center" bgcolor="#ccffcc"
| 6
| April 13
| Boston
| W 112–106
| Wilt Chamberlain (30)
| Wilt Chamberlain (26)
| Larry Costello (6)
| Municipal Auditorium11,182
| 3–3
|- align="center" bgcolor="#ffcccc"
| 7
| April 15
| @ Boston
| L 109–110
| Wilt Chamberlain (30)
| Wilt Chamberlain (32)
| Hal Greer (9)
| Boston Garden13,909
| 3–4
|-

Awards and records
Hal Greer, All-NBA Second Team
Wilt Chamberlain, All-NBA Second Team
Lucious Jackson, NBA All-Rookie Team 1st Team

References

Philadelphia 76ers seasons
Philadelphia
Philadel
Philadel